The 2018 NBA G League draft was the 18th draft of the National Basketball Association G League. The draft was held on October 20, 2018, just before the 2018–19 season. Former G League All-Star Willie Reed was selected with the first overall pick by the Salt Lake City Stars.

This was the second draft after the D League was changed to the G League after the NBA agreed to a partnership deal with Gatorade. This was also the second year that players could sign two-way contracts. This allows players to transition between an NBA team and its G-League affiliate.

Key

Draft 
Source

First round

Other notable draftees

References 

Draft
National Basketball Association lists
NBA G League draft
NBA G League draft